The Cheney Read House is an historic house at 135 Western Avenue in Cambridge, Massachusetts, USA.  The -story wood-frame house was built in 1846 by William Hyde, and is the only house in Cambridge's Cambridgeport neighborhood with a two-story Greek portico.  It has four full-height Doric columns, with a gable end that is steeper than the usual Greek Revival style.  It has a side-entry plan, with the entrance flanked by pilasters and topped by a pedimented lintel.

The house was listed on the National Register of Historic Places in 1982.

See also
National Register of Historic Places listings in Cambridge, Massachusetts

References

Houses on the National Register of Historic Places in Cambridge, Massachusetts